Kagongo is an administrative ward in Kigoma District of Kigoma Region in Tanzania. 
In 2016 the Tanzania National Bureau of Statistics report there were 10,252 people in the ward, from 19,407 in 2012. Prior to 2014 Ziwani Ward was villages in the Kagongo Ward before splitting off to its own new ward.

Villages / neighborhoods 
The ward has 5 villages and 26 hamlets.

 Kigalye
 Kagongo Ziwani
 Kahamiye
 Kigalye
 Nyantore
 Kagongo
 Bulunda
 Bungu
 Burombo
 Kalukozi
 Kitakata
 Sanze
 Kalalangabo
 Kalalangabo
 Kichangani
 Lugongoni
 Ziwani B
 Mgaraganza
 Kagina
 Katombo
 Kilembela
 Mgaraganza
 Mlati
 Msela
 Mtanga
 Kazinga
 Kizuka
 Miramba
 Mtanga A
 Mtanga B
 Ngelwa

References

Wards of Kigoma Region